David Wallumrød (born 2 October 1977 in Kongsberg, Norway) is a Norwegian pianist, known from cooperations with artists such as Knut Reiersrud, Torun Eriksen, Jarle Bernhoft, Marit Larsen, Maria Solheim, Vidar Busk, Bigbang, Maria Mena, Thomas Dybdahl and Bjørn Eidsvåg. He is the cousin of the musical artists Susanna Wallumrød, Fredrik Wallumrød and Christian Wallumrød.

Career

Wallumrød is the keyboardist within the band "Cloudberry Cream" together with Axel Røthe (drums), Nikolai Hængsle Eilertsen (bass), Knut Reiersrud (guitar), and Knut Røthe (guitar and vocals).

In the summer of 2013 he was part of the "Bushman's Revenge" appearance at Kongsberg Jazz Festival, together with Kjetil Møster.

Discography

Within "Southpaw»
2004: Like I Do
2004: Move Out of Line

Within "Lester»
2008: This Village (Deaf Ear Records)

Within "Cloudberry Cream»
2010: The Rooftop Concert

With Needlepoint
2012: Outside The Screen (BJK Music)
2015: Aimless Mary (BJK Music)

Other projects
2002: Signs, with "Mosaic",
2002: Behind Closed Doors (Kirkelig Kulturverksted), with Maria Solheim
2002: Stolpesko (Warner Music Norway, Dagbladet, Frelsesarmeen), with various artists
2002: En håndfull håp, with Tore Ljøkjel
2003: Adjust You Stereo, with Ronnie Jacobsen & Salvador Sanchez
2003: Åpne mitt hjerte for deg, with various artists
2004: Shedding Skin, with Samsaya
2004: Frail (Kirkelig Kulturverksted), with Maria Solheim
2004: Mellow (Columbia Music), with Maria Mena
2004: Verve Today 2004 (Verve Records), with various artists
2004: These Days Do You No Justice, with Jake Ziah
2004: Lullabies From the Axis of Evil (Kirkelig Kulturverksted), with various artists
2005: Smooth Jazz Cafe 7 (Universal Music Polska), with various artists
2005: Serena Maneesh (Hype City Recordings), with Serena Maneesh
2005: 11–22 (Perfect Pop), with "The Loch Ness Mouse»
2005: I krig og kjærlighet, with "Evig Poesi»
2005: Forgetting to Remember (Tru Thoughts), with "Kinny & Horne»
2005: The Blueprint Dives (Century Media), with "Extol»
2005: Verve Today 2005 (Verve Records), with various artists
2005: Soulified, with Ronnie Jacobsen
2005: The Mirrors of My Soul (Kirkelig Kulturverksted), with Rim Banna
2006: Science (Universal Music, Norway), with Thomas Dybdahl
2006: Verve Today 2006 (Verve Records), with various artists
2006: Prayers & Observations, with Torun Eriksen
2006: Your Guide to the North Sea Jazz Festival 2006, with various artists
2006: Serena Maneesh (2006), with Serena Maneesh
2007: Will There Be Spring (Strange Ways Records), with Maria Solheim
2007: Too Much Yang (Warner Music Norway), with Bigbang
2007: Sonata Mix Dwarf Cosmos, with Susanna Wallumrød
2007: Seasons of Violet – Lovesongs from Palestine (Kirkelig Kulturverksted), with Rim Banna
2007: Songs From a Persian Garden (Kirkelig Kulturverksted), with "Mahsa & Marjan»
2007: Darkness Out of Blue (EmArcy), with Silje Nergaard
2008: Ceramik City Chronicles (Universal Music Norway), with Jarle Bernhoft
2008: Tattooed on My Eyes, with Martin Hagfors
2008: Hold on Be Strong (USM), with Maria Haukaas Storeng
2008: For du skin ikkje for deg sjølv – Norske artistar tolkar Olav H. Hauge (2008), with various artists
2008: Magiske kroker & hemmeligheter, Linn Skåber & Jacob Young
2008: Moments, with Jens Andreas Kleiven
2008: Pust (2008), with Bjørn Eidsvåg
2008: Stand Your Test in Judgement, with Ronnie Jacobsen
2008: Stayer (2008), with Lars Bremnes
2008: Voodoo Without Killing Chicken (Kirkelig Kulturverksted), with "Knut Reiersrud Band»
2008: Shockadelica – 50th Anniversary Tribute to the Artist Known as Prince, with "Prince Tribute»
2009: Lights and Wires, with Jake Ziah
2009: Best of Mosaic – 15th Anniversary, with "Mosaic»
2009: Thank You, with "Safari»
2009: April Blossoms (Songs from Palestine Didicated to All the Children (2009), with Rim Banna
2009: Isle of Now (Strømland Records), with "Montée»
2009: Vi som ser i mørket, with Siri Nilsen
2009: Men and Flies, with Martin Hagfors
2009: This Gig Almost Got Me Killed, with Ovidiu Cernăţeanu
2010: 1: Man 2: Band (Universal Music Norway), with Jarle Bernhoft
2010: All Good Things, with Thom Hell
2010: 7, with Unni Wilhelmsen
2010: Hav av tid, with Ola Bremnes
2010: S-M No. 2: Abyss in a Minor (4AD), with Serena Maneesh
2010: Starts and Ends, with D'Sound
2010: Passage, with Torun Eriksen
2010: Airwaves (Universal Music), with Bjørn Johan Muri
2010: One People – Volume 2: Teranga, with One People
2011: Kjærlighet og ærlighet 1, with Jan Eggum
2011: Solidarity Breaks (Universal Music Norway), with Jarle Bernhoft
2011: One Drop is Plenty (Valley Entertainment), with Knut Reiersrud & Mighty Sam McClain
2011: Jonas Alaska (Jansen Plateproduksjon), with Jonas Alaska
2011: Min Song Og Hjarteskatt (Kirkelig Kulturverksted), with Beate S. Lech
2012: Heilt Nye Vei (Brand New Path) (Ozella), with Elin Furubotn
2013: Cricklewood Broadway  (Jazzland Recordings), with Beady Belle
2013: If Only As A Ghost (Columbia Music), with Jonas Alaska

References

External links
Profile at MusikkGuiden

20th-century Norwegian pianists
21st-century Norwegian pianists
20th-century Norwegian organists
21st-century Norwegian organists
Norwegian jazz pianists
Male organists
Norwegian jazz composers
Musicians from Kongsberg
1977 births
Living people
Male jazz composers
20th-century Norwegian male musicians
21st-century Norwegian male musicians
Needlepoint (band) members